The National Veterans' Committee was a  pro-communist political party in Albania.

History
The party contested the Constituent Assembly elections in 1991, the first multi-party elections held since World War II. It received just 0.3% of the vote, but won a single seat in the 250-seat Assembly. However, it did not contest any subsequent elections.

References

Defunct political parties in Albania
Political parties with year of establishment missing
Political parties with year of disestablishment missing
Communist parties in Albania